The 1980 United States presidential election in Vermont took place on November 4, 1980, as part of the 1980 United States presidential election which was held throughout all 50 states and the District of Columbia. Voters chose three representatives, or electors to the Electoral College, who voted for president and vice president. Vermont voted for the Republican nominee Ronald Reagan of California and his running mate George H.W. Bush of Texas. Reagan took 44.37% of the vote to incumbent Democratic President Jimmy Carter’s 38.41%, a victory margin of 5.96%. Independent John Anderson took 14.90%.

Long a bastion of liberal Republicanism, Vermont was the only state in the nation to swing Democratic in 1980, having delivered a more comfortable 11.20% margin of victory to moderate Republican Gerald Ford just four years earlier in 1976, even as the rest of the nation swung hard toward the GOP in 1980. Whereas Ford had swept every county in the state of Vermont, Reagan narrowly lost two Northwestern counties, Chittenden and Grand Isle, to Carter. The conservative Reagan would bleed a substantial amount of support in the state to John Anderson, who had been a liberal Republican congressman before mounting his independent bid for the presidency.

The already embattled incumbent Democratic president Carter was hurt in the state by the strong third party candidacy of John Anderson, a liberal Republican Congressman who ran in 1980 as an independent after failing to win the Republican Party's own presidential nomination. Anderson proved very popular with liberal and moderate voters in New England who viewed Reagan as too far to the right and with normally leaning Democratic voters who were dissatisfied with the policies of the Carter Administration. New England overall would prove to be Anderson's strongest region in the nation, with all 6 New England states giving double-digit percentages to Anderson. In fact, Vermont would ultimately prove to be John Anderson’s second strongest state in the nation after neighboring Massachusetts, his 14.9% of the vote in the state more than double the 6.61% he got nationwide.

With Reagan only winning 44.37% of the popular vote, he became the first Republican presidential candidate to win Vermont's popular vote with only a plurality since William Howard Taft won the state with only 37.13% of the vote back in 1912. This marked the second and final time to date that has happened. This election would mark the beginning of Vermont’s transition from a staunchly Republican state to being one of the most Democratic states. Ronald Reagan represented the ascendency of the conservative movement within the modern Republican Party, a party which would become increasingly dominated by conservatives, Southerners, and Evangelical Christians during and after Reagan's administration. Vermont would consequently begin shifting increasingly toward the Democrats in the years to come. It is a highly Democratic state today, as it has been for over 25 years.

Future Senator Bernie Sanders served as one of three electors for the Socialist Workers Party in Vermont.

Primaries

Results

Results by county

See also
 United States presidential elections in Vermont

References

Vermont
1980
1980 Vermont elections